The plagiopylids are a small order of ciliates, including a few forms common in anaerobic habitats.

The body cilia are dense, and arise from monokinetids with an entirely unique ultrastructure; one or two rows of dikinetids run into the oral cavity, which takes the form of a groove, with a deep tube lined by oral cilia leading to the mouth. The order was introduced by Eugen Small and Denis Lynn in 1985, who treated it as a subclass of Oligohymenophorea. Since then they tend to be treated as an independent class, possibly affiliated with the Colpodea. Class Plagiopylea is divided into two clades: one contains members of the order Plagiopylida (like Plagiopyla frontata and Trimyema compressum) and the second clade contains plagiopylean ciliate associated with denitrifying obligate endosymbiont Candidatus Azoamicus ciliaticola.

References

Further reading 

 
 

Intramacronucleata
Ciliate orders